Jack Brasington (born September 9, 1976) is a former professional tennis player from the United States.

Career
Before he turned professional, Brasington played collegiate tennis for the University of Texas at Austin. He attained a best ranking of seventh in the nation and holds the university record for most wins, 121.

Brasington made the second round of the 2001 US Open, in what was his maiden Grand Slam appearance. His opening round win, over Gianluca Pozzi, was decided in a fifth set tiebreak, during which the American saved a match point. He won the tiebreak 8–6, to set up a second round meeting with Andy Roddick, who would beat Brasington in four sets.

In 2002 he managed to get past qualifying and play in the main draw of all four Grand Slam tournaments. He reached the second round of the French Open that year, with a win over Federico Luzzi. At the 2002 US Open, in addition to the singles, he played in the doubles for the only time, with Vince Spadea. His only other Grand Slam appearance was in the 2003 Australian Open, where he lost his first round match to Sjeng Schalken.

Challenger Titles

Singles: (1)

Doubles: (1)

References

1976 births
Living people
American male tennis players
Texas Longhorns men's tennis players
Tennis people from Florida